The Nigerian National Assembly delegation from Kwara comprises three Senators representing Kwara Central, Kwara South, and Kwara North, and six   Representatives representing  Baruten/Kaiama, Ekiti/Isin/Irepodun/Oke-ero, Asa/Ilorin West, Ilorin East/South, Offa/Oyun/Ifelodun, and Edu/Moro/Patigi.

Fourth Republic

The 4th Parliament (1999 - 2003)

References
Official Website - National Assembly House of Representatives (Kwara State)
 Senator List

Kwara State
National Assembly (Nigeria) delegations by state